Speaker for the Dead is a 1986 science fiction novel by American writer Orson Scott Card, an indirect sequel to the 1985 novel Ender's Game.  The book takes place around the year 5270, some 3,000 years after the events in Ender's Game. However because of relativistic space travel at near-light speed Ender himself is only about 35 years old.

This is the first book to describe the Starways Congress, a high standpoint legislation for the human space colonies, and the Hundred Worlds, the planets with human colonies that are tightly intertwined by Ansible technology which enables instantaneous communication across any distance.

Like Ender's Game, the book won the Nebula Award in 1986 and the Hugo Award in 1987. Speaker for the Dead was published in a slightly revised edition in 1991. It was followed by Xenocide and Children of the Mind.

Setting 
Some years after the eradication of the Formic species (in Ender's Game), Ender Wiggin writes a book called The Hive Queen, describing the life of the Formics as described to him by the dormant Formic Queen whom he secretly carries. As humanity uses light-speed travel to establish new colonies, Ender and his sister Valentine age slowly through relativistic travel. Ender's older brother, the now-aged Hegemon of Earth, Peter Wiggin, recognizes Ender's writings in The Hive Queen, and requests Ender write for him once he dies. Ender agrees and authors The Hegemon. These two books, written under the pseudonym "Speaker for the Dead", launch a new spiritual movement of Speakers for the Dead, who have authority to investigate and eulogize a person and their work after their death. The Hive Queen also shifts societal opinion about the Formic war, leading humanity to view Ender Wiggin, previously a hero, as responsible for a tragic and cruel xenocide, 'xeno-', meaning alien, and '-cide', referring to the act of killing, together meaning the act of killing populations of aliens; comparable to genocide.

Three thousand years after the Formic xenocide, humans have spread across the Hundred Worlds, ruled by Starways Congress. A Brazilian Catholic human colony called Milagre is established on the planet Lusitania (1886 S.C.). The planet is home to a sentient species of symbiotic forest dwellers. The colonists (who primarily speak Portuguese) dub them "Pequeninos" (Little Ones) but they are often referred to as "piggies" due to their porcine snouts. Their society is matriarchal and gender-segregated, and their belief system centers around the trees of the forests. The Pequeninos prove to be of great interest to scientists. Since humans had destroyed the only sentient species they had encountered (the Formics), special care is taken to ensure no similar mistakes are made with the Pequeninos. The colony is fenced in, strictly regulated to limit contact with the Pequeninos to a handful of scientists, and forbidden to share human technology or culture with them.

Shortly after the colony's founding, many of the colonists die from the Descolada virus (Portuguese for "uncoiled"), which alters DNA and causes terrible pain, rampant cancerous growth of fungus and even extra limbs, decay of healthy tissue, and death. The xenobiologists Gusto and Cida von Hesse manage to create a treatment for the virus before succumbing to it themselves (1936 S.C.), leaving behind their young daughter Novinha.

Synopsis

Eight years after the Descolada virus is cured, Xenologer Pipo and his thirteen-year-old son and apprentice Libo have developed a friendship with the Pequeninos. They allow Novinha to join their science team as the colony's only xenobiologist after she passes the test at age thirteen. After accidentally sharing information about human genders with a male Pequenino named Rooter, the scientists find Rooter's body eviscerated, a sapling planted within it. Guessing this may be a torturous sacrificial ritual, restrictions on studying the Pequeninos are enforced, barring the humans from asking questions directly at Pequininos.

A few years later, Novinha discovers that every lifeform on Lusitania carries the Descolada virus which, though lethal to humans, appears to serve a beneficial purpose to native lifeforms. When Pipo learns of this, he suddenly has an insight, and before he tells the others, races off to talk to the Pequeninos. Libo and Novinha find Pipo's body cut open just as Rooter's had been, but with no sapling planted. As Pipo's death appears unprovoked, the Pequeninos are now considered a threat by the Starways Congress and restrictions on studying them are tightened. Distraught, Novinha makes a call for a Speaker for the Dead for Pipo. She is in love with Libo but fears that if he sees her files of research he will make the same discovery as Pipo and meet the same fate. She marries another colonist, Marcos Ribeira, so as to lock her files from being opened.

Andrew Wiggin, unbeknownst by others to be the Ender Wiggin responsible for the Formic xenocide, lives innocuously on the planet Trondheim. He responds to Novinha's call, parting with his sister, Valentine, who has traveled with him but is now settled with a family. He travels with an artificial intelligence named Jane who communicates with Ender through a jewel earring; she was born in the Ansible network that enables faster-than-light communications and keeps her existence secret. After relativistic travel, Ender arrives at Lusitania 22 years later (1970 S.C.), finding that Novinha canceled her request for a Speaker five days after sending it. In the intervening time, Libo died in the same manner as Pipo, and Marcos succumbed to a chronic illness. Novinha's eldest children, Ela and Miro, have requested a Speaker for Libo and Marcos. Ender, gaining access to all of the appropriate files, learns of tension since Pipo's death: Novinha has turned away from xenobiology to study crop growth and had a loveless relationship with Marcos; Miro has secretly worked with Libo's daughter Ouanda to continue to study the Pequeninos, breaking the law to share human technology and knowledge with them. Miro and Ouanda have fallen in love. With Ender's arrival, Miro tells him that one of the Pequeninos, Human, has taken a great interest in Ender, and Ender becomes aware that Human can hear messages from the Formic Hive Queen. Ender discovers that Marcos was infertile: all six of Novinha's children were fathered by Libo. Ender also learns what Pipo had seen in Novinha's data.

As word of Miro's and Ouanda's illegal sharing of human technology with the Pequeninos is reported to Congress, Ender secretly meets with the Pequeninos. They know his true identity and they implore him to help them be part of civilization, while the Formic Queen tells Ender that Lusitania would be an ideal place to restart the hive, as her race can help guide the Pequeninos. Congress orders Miro and Ouanda to be sent off-planet for penal action and the colony be disbanded. Ender delivers his eulogy for Marcos, revealing Novinha's infidelity. Miro, distraught to learn that he is Ouanda's half-brother, attempts to escape to the Pequeninos, but he suffers neurological damage after he tries to cross the electrified fence. Ender reveals to the colony what Pipo learned: every life form on Lusitania is paired with another through the Descolada virus, so that the death of one births the other. In the case of the Pequeninos, they become trees when they die. The colony leaders agree to rebel against Congress, severing their Ansible connection and deactivating the fence, allowing Ender, Ouanda, and Ela to go with Human to speak to the Pequenino wives, to help establish a case to present to Congress.

The Pequenino wives help Ender corroborate the complex life cycle of the Pequeninos, affirming that the death ritual Pipo observed was to help create "fathertrees" who fertilize the Pequenino females to continue their race. The Pequeninos believed they were honoring Pipo, and later Libo, by helping them become fathertrees, but Ender explains that humans lack this "third life", and if the Pequeninos are to cohabitate with humans, they must respect this difference. To affirm their understanding and agreement, Ender is asked to perform the ritual of giving Human "third life" as a fathertree.

Miro recovers from most of the physical damage from his encounter with the fence, but he is partially paralyzed; Ender transfers Jane to him, and she becomes Miro's companion. Valentine and her family decide to travel from Trondheim to Lusitania to help with the revolt and will arrive in some decades due to relativistic travel; Ender has Miro meet them halfway. Novinha finally absolves herself of her guilt for the death of Pipo and Libo. She and Ender marry. Ender plants the Hive Queen as per her request, and he writes his third book, a biography of the life of the Pequenino, Human.

Lack of film adaptation
During the film production of Ender’s Game (released November 1, 2013) fans began inquiring about films adaptations of Speaker for the Dead, the next book in Card’s series. At the Los Angeles Times Book Festival (April 20, 2013), Card stated why he does not want Speaker for the Dead made into a film: 
"Speaker for the Dead is unfilmable," Card said in response to a question from the audience. "It consists of talking heads, interrupted by moments of excruciating and unwatchable violence. Now, I admit, there's plenty of unwatchable violence in film, but never attached to my name. Speaker for the Dead, I don't want it to be filmed. I can't imagine it being filmed."

Influence
Card writes in his introduction to the 1991 edition that he has received letters from readers who have conducted "Speakings" at funerals. At these funerals a selected speaker would give an honest representation of the deceased life, providing an opportunity for family and friends to acknowledge, heal and mourn. This practice has been used in complex deaths such as a drug overdose or the death of an abusive family member.

Reception

Dave Langford reviewed Speaker for the Dead for White Dwarf #91, and stated that "Despite token guilt at his genocide of the sensitively named alien 'buggers;' (previous book), Ender never suffers for his triumphs - even though Card is strong on suffering for everyone else, and happily cripples a young boy to add needless excitement to the finale. I was impressed by this thoughtful SF adventure, but with reservations ..."

Awards
Nebula Award winner, 1986
Hugo Award winner, 1987
Locus Award winner, 1987
John W. Campbell Memorial Award nominee, 1987
Kurd-Laßwitz-Preis winner, 1989

See also
List of Ender's Game characters
List of works by Orson Scott Card

References

External links
 
 About the novel Speaker for the Dead from Card's website
 Speaker for the Dead at Worlds Without End
 

1986 science fiction novels
1986 American novels
Fiction set in the 6th millennium
American science fiction novels
Ender's Game series books
Hugo Award for Best Novel-winning works
Nebula Award for Best Novel-winning works
Tor Books books
Novels set on fictional planets